Eva Franco (1906–1999) was an Argentine stage, film and television actress.

Selected filmography
 Medio millón por una mujer (1940)
 Grandma (1979)
 Count to Ten (1985)

References

Bibliography
 Finkielman, Jorge. The Film Industry in Argentina: An Illustrated Cultural History. McFarland, 24 Dec 2003.

External links

1906 births
1999 deaths
Argentine television actresses
Argentine film actresses
Argentine stage actresses
People from Buenos Aires